Hpapun District (Phlone); or Mutraw District is a district of the Karen State in Myanmar. Area 6.722,5 km2. The principal town is Hpapun. According to 2014 Myanmar Census, the total population in Hpapun District is 35,085.

Townships and towns 
The district contains the following townships and towns:
 Hpapun Township
 Hpapun
 Kamamaung

References

External links
 Kayin State - District Map Myanmar Information Management Unit (MIMU)

Districts of Myanmar
Kayin State